Arcola is an unincorporated community in Bulloch County, in the U.S. state of Georgia.

History
In 1900, the community had 50 inhabitants.

References

Unincorporated communities in Bulloch County, Georgia